Aundh is an upscale, affluent neighbourhood in the city of Pune, India. Since its inception in the mid-1990s, Aundh has developed significantly as a residential area with proximity to the University of Pune.

History
Aundh was a village where the Battle of Khadki took place in 1817. Today, the area has become one of the best and up-market areas in the city.

The residential real-estate prices in this area have seen a huge uptrend which has been largely driven by the demand coming from IT professionals as well as migrants from various parts of the country. Its proximity to the Mumbai-Pune express way and connectivity to Shivaji Nagar, makes it preferable to reside there than other parts of the city. Aundh also has become famous for various modern and innovative places of recreation and indulgence, such as the presence of a gourmet food store - Fine foods, gymnasiums - Golds Gym, Air, and a 3 star hotel - Seasons. Aundh is a popular hangout destination for the cosmopolitan crowd of Pune. The area is also a major hub for business as there are many companies, high end showrooms, high end health clubs and recreational outlets.

The Westend Mall near Parihar Chowk is developed in 2016 by Suma Shilp on a 67,500 sq.m. (17 acres) plot with 250 Key 5 Star Hilton Hotel, Shoppers Stop, and Cinepolis 8 Screen Multiplex with Pune's first IMAX theatre, one of the major malls in Pune.

With its close proximity to schools in and around the area, Aundh offers an array of activity centers for children of various age groups. This place has come to be a self-sustained locality, and it wouldn't be wrong to compare it to other suburban areas across the nation. Aundh is one of the best residential areas in Pune like Koregaon Park can be termed as the best commercial area in Pune. The area today is among the most plush and upmarket in the city, owing to extremely high real-estate prices. The area is amongst the first choice for metropolitan people from different states and countries owing to the self-sufficiency.

Developmental activities
Road from Parihar Chowk to Breman Chowk is currently been redesigned as a part of Smart City Pune project. The layout of road will mainly address traffic problem during peak hours and parking problems. Moreover, the layout has well designed space for pedestrians, a cycling track and sitting arrangements around trees, wi-fi, vertical garden etc. and has met the international standards.

Sub-areas
Aundh can be divided into the old Aundhgaon and the newly constructed suburban areas. The suburb encompasses the areas along the University road, after Governor house, up to Rajiv Gandhi Bridge on River Mula, across which is Sangvi (and the Aundh Chest Hospital) in one direction and Spicer college region to Baner in the opposite direction.

Social life and entertainment
Aundh is home to various malls like Westend Mall, Reliance Mart, and DMart which are most sought after places on weekends. Westend is a one-stop shop as there is a food court, shopping sites like MAX, Shoppers Stop, Lavie,Bhooj Adda etc, and also multiple screen Cinepolis for movie shows.

Hospitals
 Shashwat Hospital
 Vitalife Medipoint Hospital
 Dr Kothari's Dental Privil
 The Inamdar Heart Clinic
 Shreyas Hospital
 Acme Dental Lounge
 Shraddha Hospital
 Mann clinic
 Latkar Clinic
 Aundh Kuti Hospital
 Geeta's Advanced Dental Clinic
 AIMS Aundh Hospital

See also
 Pimple Gurav
 Pimple Saudagar
 Pimpri
 List of roads in Pune

References

Geography of Maharashtra
Neighbourhoods in Pune
Geography of Pune